Shuko Aoyama and Vera Dushevina were the defending champions, but Dushevina chose not to participate.  Aoyama successfully defended the title alongside Gabriela Dabrowski, defeating Hiroko Kuwata and Kurumi Nara in the final, 6–1, 6–2.

Seeds

Draw

Draw

References
General

Draw

Citi Open - Women's Doubles